This is a list of all naval aircraft ever used by the United Kingdom. This list includes lists of naval aircraft used by the UK at specific time periods such as the Modern day and World War II. It will also include two lists one for the all the aircraft ever used by the Royal Naval Air Service the United Kingdoms original naval Air Service and all the aircraft ever used by the Fleet Air Arm the United Kingdom current naval air service.

Aircraft of the Royal Naval Air Service 

 List of aircraft of the Royal Naval Air Service

Aircraft of the Fleet Air Arm 

 List of aircraft of the Fleet Air Arm

World War II 

 List of Fleet Air Arm aircraft in World War II

Modern day 

 List of active United Kingdom military aircraft

Gallery of progressiom of British naval fighters

References

 
Aircraft
Lists of military aircraft